Niranjan Das may refer to:

 Niranjan Das (politician), a Hindu politician in the Afghan Emirate
 Niranjan Das (wrestler), an Indian athlete